Carmen Rivera (born October 1, 1964) is an American playwright, teacher, and producer. Working for over 20 years in the arts, she is best known for her play La Gringa (1996) and the musical Celia: The Life and Music of Celia Cruz (2007), which she co-wrote with playwright and husband Cándido Tirado.

Rivera's plays have opened and seen success off-broadway. Her work has appeared at INTAR, La MaMa Experimental Theatre Club (E.T.C.), the Theater for the New City, and other domestic theaters in cities across the United States. Her plays have also been produced internationally at theatre festivals in Moscow, Chile, Puerto Rico, Colombia, and Bolivia. She is a founding member and co-executive director of Educational Play Productions (E.P.P.).

Biography

Early life and education 
Rivera's parents were both born in Puerto Rico and came to the United States when they were about 8 years old. Rivera was born in New York City on October 1, 1964. Her parents, who learned English upon coming to the United States, did not teach Rivera Spanish and she did not learn the language until college. It was fluency in the language that allowed her to access the stories within her Spanish-speaking family.

Rivera holds a BA from New York University in economics and Latin American Literature. From a young age, Rivera loved to write and often took classes at the Puerto Rican Travelling Theatre. This led her to return to New York University to pursue her MA. She created her own course of study consisting of playwrighting, Latin American theatre, and educational theatre.

Professional career 
Rivera has enjoyed both domestic and international success for many of her pieces. One of her first and most successful plays, La Gringa explores the Rivera's own feelings regarding the Puerto Rican diaspora and her own feelings of duality as a New York-born Puerto Rican. Many of her other pieces reflect the Puerto Rican diaspora, a narrative she is personally interested in exploring.

In 2003, Rivera and husband Cándido Tirado founded Educational Play Productions, a production company that bring plays into New York Public Schools. They continue to serve as co-directors. Outside of her continued work as a playwright, Rivera is a Teacher Artist with the Manhattan Theatre Club, Arts Connections and Teachers and Writers.

Rivera is also a member of the Dramatists Guild, the Theatre Communications Group, NALIP (the National Association of Latino Independent Producers) and Sigma Delta Pi (inducted June 1986).

Plays

Off-broadway 
La Gringa (1996): A play following a young woman in search of her identity. María Elena Garcia visits Puerto Rico in the hopes of reconnecting with her extended family and her homeland. Feeling like an American in Puerto Rico and like a Puerto Rican in America, Maria feels like she doesn't belong anywhere. The play is the longest running, off-broadway, Spanish-language play; it celebrated its 20th anniversary in 2016 and continues to be in repertory at Repertorio Español. La Gringa was awarded the OBIE Award (Off-Broadway Theater Award) in 1996.
"Rivera’s script is both a classic “fish out of water” tale and a glimpse into the relations of a particular, quirky family...La Gringa is akin to a sitcom, but more “Black-ish” or “Roseanne” than “Full House” – a show that’s funny but substantial, with respect for its characters and their struggles...A solid production from beginning to end, La Gringa is heartwarming but not sappy..." — Lauren Whalen, Chicago Theatre Beat

La Lupe: My Life, My Destiny (2001): A musical that explores the life and stardom of Cuban-born singer Guadalupe Victoria Yoli — La Lupe. The musical featured performances in both English and Spanish and was awarded the ACE Award from the Association of Journalists and Writers for Best Production in 2001. The musical opened at the PRTT (Puerto Rican Traveling Theatre).
"Victoria Lupe Yoli was a poor kid from Cuba whose dad wanted her to be a teacher. But La Lupe could belt out a song like no one else. In Carmen Rivera's adept biodrama, we watch her rise from amateur contest winner to a six-year partnership with Tito Puente, sold-out performances in Carnegie Hall, and talk show stardom. There are 14 songs in all, but "La Lupe: My Life, My Destiny" is not a revue with a shoestring plot line. It's an inside look at fame and misfortune, the dramatic equivalent of a page turner. Rivera cleverly frames it with a Santería prophecy that the singer would enjoy more success than she ever dreamed before experiencing a terrible fall." — Glenda Frank, Backstage

Celia: The Life and Music of Celia Cruz (2007): Co-written by Rivera and her husband, Cándido Tirado, the musical is told through the voice of Celia Cruz's husband Pedro Knight. Celia takes the audience through the life and early beginnings of Celia Cruz through her music and has seen both off-Broadway national and international success in Chicago, Miami, and Puerto Rico. Celia received the HOLA Award in 2008.
"Whether or not you like salsa—lots of it, at top volume—will determine if Celia is for you. This combination concert and weepy remembrance of Cuban-born salsa queen Celia Cruz (1925–2003) isn’t much of a musical, but it is an effective delivery system for about 30 energetic, high-decibel numbers that feature a hardworking band. Framed by the retirement-home reminiscences of Cruz’s husband, Pedro Knight, the action shifts between Pedro regaling his male nurse with tales of Celia’s rise to fame in Cuba and America... Unfortunately, though, we always return to old wistful Pedro, the guy who lived lovingly but begrudgingly in the shadow of his famous wife." — David Cote, TimeOut New York

Other works 
Rivera has written several plays that have received recognition:

In addition, she has authored or co-authored numerous works for her Educational Play Productions:
 The Next Stop (INTAR / Repertorio Español)
 Under The Mango Tree (INTAR)
 Ghosts in Brooklyn
 The Loves of our Lives
 The Next Cycle
 Betty’s Garage
 Delia’s Race
 Plastic Flowers
 The Power of Words

Filmography 
The screen adaptation of La Gringa was a finalist in the International Latino Film Festival/MTV Screenplay Competition in 2001.

Honors and awards 
 1995 – 1996: Writing Fellowship New York Theatre Workshop
 1995 – 1997: Van Lier Fellowship for New Dramatists
 1997: Legacy Award for the Achievement in Playwriting from the Puerto Rican Traveling Theatre
 1999: Lo Mejor de Nuestra Comunidad (The Best of Our Community) from Puerto Rican Cultural Organization, recognizing individuals who practice their craft in their community

References

External links 

 Educational Play Productions

Hispanic and Latino American dramatists and playwrights
Living people
American women dramatists and playwrights
1964 births
21st-century American women